Germán Medina Triviño (died 30 March 2021) was a Colombian politician. He served as Governor of the Caquetá Department from 2010 to 2011.

Biography
At university, Triviño studied accounting, tax technology, and marketing management. A member of the Colombia Liberal Party, he held several political positions. In 2003, he ran unsuccessfully for Mayor of Florencia.

Accused of having links with paramilitaries in the Huila Department, Triviño was allegedly linked to the 2000 deaths of professors Héctor Manrique Peñuela and Jesús María Cuellar. He denied any allegations of links to paramilitary groups.

From 2008 to 2010, Triviño worked as an assistant for the Chamber of Representatives of Colombia. In 2010, he was Elected as Governor of the Caquetá Department in 2010 after the incumbent Governor Luis Francisco Cuéllar was assassinated by the Revolutionary Armed Forces of Colombia. He received 36,960 total votes with support from the Colombian Conservative Party and the Alternative Democratic Pole. His main rival was Carlos Orlando Cuéllar of the Social Party of National Unity, nephew of the late former Governor.

From 2020 until his death in 2021, Triviño served as an advisor to the Mayor of Florencia, Luis Antonio Ruiz.

Germán Medina Triviño was assassinated on 30 March 2021 while leaving his home in the Torasso sector of Florencia by two hitmen on a motorcycle. A reward of $50 million by authorities was offered for information on the assassins. His murder prompted reactions from several political figures, including , Pablo Catatumbo, and Timoleón Jiménez.

References

2021 deaths
21st-century Colombian politicians
Governors of Caquetá Department
Colombian Liberal Party politicians
Assassinated Colombian politicians
Deaths by firearm in Colombia
People murdered in Colombia
Male murder victims